Deep Sea Detectives is a television show on The History Channel. The show began airing in 2003.

In a post  dated September 1, 2006 on the Deep Sea Detectives' message board, series producer Kirk Wolfinger stated that the show would not be renewed for another season.

External links 
 
 TV.com summary of the show

History (American TV channel) original programming
2003 American television series debuts
2006 American television series endings